is a 1958 Japanese black-and-white period drama (jidaigeki) directed by Kazuo Mori.

Cast 
 Raizo Ichikawa as Ban Sakon 
 Michiko Ai
 Tokiko Mita

References

External links 
 

Jidaigeki films
Japanese black-and-white films
1958 films
Films directed by Kazuo Mori
Daiei Film films
Films scored by Ichirō Saitō
1950s Japanese films